Mooresville is an unincorporated community in Monongalia County, West Virginia, United States.

Mooresville was platted in the 1840s by Rawley Moore, and named for him.

References 

Unincorporated communities in West Virginia
Unincorporated communities in Monongalia County, West Virginia